Senjedu (also Romanized as Senjedū) is a village in Kuh Yakhab Rural District, Dastgerdan District, Tabas County, South Khorasan Province, Iran. At the 2006 census, its population was 39, in 20 families.

References 

Populated places in Tabas County